Henry John Barnett (25 July 1899 – 31 January 1979) was an Australian rules footballer who played with Richmond in the Victorian Football League (VFL).		

Barnett enlisted in the Royal Australian Air Force in August 1928 and served until July 1954, being stationed at RAAF Base Richmond for most of that time.

Barnett first played senior football on the west coast of Tasmania with the Gormanston Football Club, which played in the Lyell Miners Football Association, based in Queenstown. The large mines in the region supplied sufficient players for 9 teams.

Notes

External links 

1899 births
1979 deaths
VFL/AFL players born outside Australia
Australian rules footballers from Victoria (Australia)
Richmond Football Club players
Royal Australian Air Force personnel of World War II